Čučja Mlaka is a small settlement on the left bank of the Krka River in the Municipality of Škocjan in southeastern Slovenia. Within the municipality, it belongs to the Village Community of Dobrava pri Škocjanu and Tomažja Vas. The area is part of the historical region of Lower Carniola. The municipality is now included in the Southeast Slovenia Statistical Region.

References

External links
Čučja Mlaka at Geopedia

Populated places in the Municipality of Škocjan